Lairmont Manor, also known as the Larrabee House, is a 1914 Italian Renaissance style home located in Bellingham, Washington. It was designed by Carl Gould, who is most known for designing the main library at the University of Washington. The home was built for C. X. Larrabee, who wanted one of the finest homes in the northwest, but he died before its completion. Currently, the home is used for weddings and other special occasions.

References

External links 
 Lairmont Manor Website

Buildings and structures in Bellingham, Washington
Houses on the National Register of Historic Places in Washington (state)
Houses completed in 1915
Houses in Whatcom County, Washington
National Register of Historic Places in Whatcom County, Washington